David Arthur Short, OAM is an Australian Paralympic tandem cycling pilot, who piloted Kieran Modra in sprint events, most notably at the 2004 Athens Games. He won a gold medal at the games in the Men's Sprint Tandem B1-3 event, for which he received a Medal of the Order of Australia. In the second of the three races in the individual sprint semi-final, Short and Modra fell off their bike after its front tyre rolled off the wheel. Despite having skin torn off their arms, legs and shoulders in the fall, they won the third semi-final race and rode in the final 45 minutes later, where they won the gold medal.

References

Paralympic cyclists of Australia
Cyclists at the 2004 Summer Paralympics
Medalists at the 2004 Summer Paralympics
Paralympic gold medalists for Australia
Paralympic sighted guides
Recipients of the Medal of the Order of Australia
Living people
Australian male cyclists
Year of birth missing (living people)
Paralympic medalists in cycling